Radix jordii is a species of air-breathing freshwater snail, an aquatic pulmonate gastropod mollusk in the family Lymnaeidae, the pond snails.

Distribution 
This species occurs in the Balearic Islands.

References

External links 

Lymnaeidae
Gastropods described in 2007
Endemic fauna of the Balearic Islands